Golden Rainbow may refer to:

 Golden Rainbow (musical), a 1968 musical
 Golden Rainbow (TV series), a South Korean TV series
 A Golden Rainbow, a 1915 American silent short film
 "Golden Rainbow", a song by Seals and Crofts from the 1975 album I'll Play for You
 Drosera microphylla, a carnivorous plant endemic to Western Australia